Military Band of the Black Sea Fleet is a military band unit of the Russian Armed Forces. It is a branch of the Military Band Service of the Armed Forces of Russia. It has performed tasks assigned during official visits of the ships of the Black Sea Fleet to countries with diplomatic with Russia since 1980. Since December 2009, the orchestra has been led by Senior Lieutenant Mikhail Khalilov.

History 
It was formed on February 24, 1947 in the city of Sevastopol. In 1966, the orchestra was reorganized as the Headquarters Military Band of the 34th Black Sea Fleet.

In 2001, the Ministry of Culture of Russia granted the Orchestra the honor of opening the Festival of Russian Culture in the city of Cannes, France. On February 9, 2012, the 34th Military Band of the Black Sea Fleet was given its current name.

See also 
Military Band Service of the Armed Forces of Russia

Military Band of the Eastern Military District

References 

Russian military bands
Military units and formations established in 1947
1947 establishments in Russia